Punto Fijo may refer to:

 Punto Fijo, city in Venezuela
 Punto Fijo Pact, a formal arrangement arrived at between representatives of Venezuela's three main political parties in 1958
 Punto Fijo (album), 2003 album by Szidi Tobias